Zahir Raheem (born November 7, 1976 in Philadelphia, Pennsylvania) is an American boxer. Known as "King Raheem", his current professional record stands at 33 wins, 3 losses with 20 knockouts.

After a stellar amateur career, which included a 213-4 record, 15-1 against international competition, and a spot in the 1996 U.S. Olympic team, Raheem turned professional on November 16, 1996, with a 4th-round KO win over Clifford Watford. Being among the less touted of the '96 U.S. Olympians, Raheem worked his way up the rankings slowly, before finally receiving a shot against Rocky Juarez. Raheem lost to Juarez.

Raheem's next big fight was against legendary Mexican Erik Morales on September 10, 2005 in the Staples Center in Los Angeles. Morales was a heavy favorite and the matchup was viewed as warmup for his already scheduled superfight against Manny Pacquiao. Raheem surprised everyone by dominating the fight from the beginning by using excellent footwork and body movement, and never let Morales find his rhythm. Raheem won by unanimous decision, winning Ring Magazine upset of the year for 2005, and cemented himself as a lightweight contender.

On April 29, 2006, Zahir Raheem lost by split decision against Acelino Freitas for the recently vacated WBO Lightweight title. This was Raheem's first world title fight. On July 5, 2008 Raheem was knocked out by a South African boxer Ali Funeka.

Amateur Highlights
Won the Bantamweight Olympic Trials in 1996, by defeating the following boxers:
Rosendo Sanchez (points)
Teaunce Shepherd (points)
Steve Carter (points)
Steve Carter (points), this bout was at the Olympic Box-Offs in Augusta, GA

At the 1996 Atlanta Olympic Games, Raheem lost in the second round. His results were:
Jong-Gil Oh (North Korea) won on points
Arnaldo Mesa (Cuba) lost by TKO 1

References

External links
 

1976 births
Living people
African-American boxers
Lightweight boxers
African-American Muslims
Boxers at the 1996 Summer Olympics
Boxers from Philadelphia
Olympic boxers of the United States
American male boxers
21st-century African-American sportspeople
20th-century African-American sportspeople